Tocos do Moji is a municipality (município) in the state of Minas Gerais in Brazil. The population is 4,109 (2020 est.) in an area of 115 km².

References

Municipalities in Minas Gerais